The 2015 Nigerian Senate election in Adamawa State was held on March 28, 2015, to elect members of the Nigerian Senate to represent Adamawa State. Binta Masi Garba representing Adamawa North, Ahmad Abubakar representing Adamawa South and Abdul-Aziz Nyako representing Adamawa Central all won on the platform of All Progressives Congress.

Overview

Summary

Results

Adamawa North 
All Progressives Congress candidate Binta Masi Garba won the election, defeating People's Democratic Party candidate Bala Nggilari and other party candidates.

Adamawa South 
All Progressives Congress candidate Ahmad Abubakar won the election, defeating People's Democratic Party candidate Jonathan Zwingina and other party candidates.

Adamawa Central 
All Progressives Congress candidate Abdul-Aziz Nyako won the election, defeating People's Democratic Party candidate Aliyu Idi Hong and other party candidates.

References 

Adamawa State Senate elections
March 2015 events in Nigeria
Adam